Githopsis specularioides is a flowering plant known by the common name common bluecup. It is an annual herb which bears very small tubular flowers with white throats and five pointed purple petals. It is found on the west coast of North America from California to British Columbia.

External links
Jepson Manual Treatment
USDA Plants Profile
Rare plants of Washington

Campanuloideae
Flora of California
Flora of the Sierra Nevada (United States)
Natural history of the California chaparral and woodlands
Natural history of the California Coast Ranges
Natural history of the San Francisco Bay Area
Flora without expected TNC conservation status